Favorite is a South Korean girl group formed by Astory Entertainment in 2017. They debuted on July 5, 2017, with extended play My Favorite. The group debuted in Japan with single album Catch Me, released on November 6, 2019.

Members
Sourced from Favorite's official japanese website.
 Saebom (새봄) – lead vocal
 Seoyeon (서연) – sub vocal, lead dancer
 Gaeul (가을) – leader, main rapper
 Sugyeong (수경) – main dancer
 Jeonghee (정희) – sub vocal
 Ahra (아라) – main vocal

Discography

Extended plays

Single albums

Singles

Videography

Music videos

Concert

Showcase
 Favorite Japan Debut Showcase「Favorite First Time in Japan」(2019)

References

South Korean girl groups
South Korean dance music groups
Musical groups established in 2017
K-pop music groups
Musical groups from Seoul
2017 establishments in South Korea
South Korean pop music groups